Uropygi is an arachnid order comprising invertebrates commonly known as whip scorpions or vinegaroons (also spelled vinegarroons and vinegarones). They are often called uropygids. The name "whip scorpion" refers to their resemblance to true scorpions and possession of a whiplike tail, and "vinegaroon" refers to their ability when attacked to discharge an offensive, vinegar-smelling liquid, which contains acetic acid. The order may also be called Thelyphonida. Both names, Uropygi and Thelyphonida, may be used either in a narrow sense for the order of whip scorpions, or in a broad sense which includes the order Schizomida. For clarity, sensu stricto or s.s. may be added to specify the narrow sense, and sensu lato or s.l. added to specify the broad sense. When these additions are omitted, the names Uropygi and Thelyphonida are ambiguous.

Taxonomy

Carl Linnaeus first described a whip scorpion in 1758, although he did not distinguish it from what are now regarded as different kinds of arachnid, calling it Phalangium caudatum. Phalangium is now used as a name for a genus of harvestmen (Opiliones). In 1802, Pierre André Latreille was the first to use a genus name solely for whip scorpions, namely Thelyphonus. Latreille later explained the name as meaning "", meaning "who kills". One name for the order, Thelyphonida, is based on Latreille's genus name. It was first used, as the French , by Latreille in 1804, and later by Octavius Pickard-Cambridge in 1872 (with the spelling Thelyphonidea).

The alternative name, Uropygi, was first used by Tamerlan Thorell in 1883. It means "tail rump", from Ancient Greek , from  "tail" and  "rump" referring to the whip-like flagellum on the end of the pygidium, a small plate made up of the last three segments of the abdominal exoskeleton.

The classification and scientific name used for whip scorpions varies. Originally, Amblypygi (whip spiders), Uropygi and Schizomida (short-tailed whipscorpions) formed a single order of arachnids, Pedipalpi. Pedipalpi was later divided into two orders, Amblypygi and Uropygi (or Uropygida). Schizomida was then split off from Uropygi into a separate order. The remainder has either continued to be called by the same name, Uropygi, possibly distinguished as Uropygi sensu stricto, or called Thelyphonida. When the name Uropygi is used for the whip scorpions, the clade containing Uropygi and Schizomida may be called Thelyphonida, or Thelyphonida s.l. Conversely, when the name Thelyphonida is used for the whip scorpions alone, the parent clade may be called Uropygi, or Uropygi s.l. The table below summarizes the two usages. When the qualifications s.l. and s.s. are omitted, the names Uropygi and Thelyphonida are ambiguous.

Phylogenetic studies show the three groups, Amblypygi, Uropygi s.s. and Schizomida, to be closely related. The Uropygi s.s. and Schizomida likely diverged in the late Carboniferous, somewhere in the tropics of Pangaea.

Description
An extinct Mesoproctus from the Lower Cretaceous Crato Formation could be the same size. Because of their legs, claws, and "whip", though, they can appear much larger, and the heaviest specimen weighed was 12.4 grams (0.44 oz).

The opisthosoma consists of 12 segments. The first segment forms a pedicel, and each of the next eight segments has dorsal tergites. The last three segments are fused into closed rings that ends with the flagellum, made up of 30-40 units.

Like the related orders Schizomida and Amblypygi, whip scorpions use only six legs for walking, with the first two legs serving as antennae-like sensory organs. All species also have very large scorpion-like pedipalps (pincers) but there is an additional large spine on each palpal tibia. They have one pair of median eyes at the front of the cephalothorax and up till five pairs of lateral eyes on each side of the head, a pattern also found in scorpions. Whip scorpions have no venom glands, but they have glands near the rear of their abdomen that can spray a combination of acetic acid and caprylic acid when they are bothered. The acetic acid gives this spray a vinegar-like smell, giving rise to the common name vinegaroon.

Behaviour
Whip scorpions are carnivorous, nocturnal hunters feeding mostly on insects, millipedes, scorpions, and terrestrial isopods, but sometimes on worms and slugs. Mastigoproctus sometimes preys on small vertebrates. The prey is crushed between special teeth on the inside of the trochanters (the second segment of the "legs") of the front appendages. They are valuable in controlling the population of cockroaches and crickets.

Males secrete a spermatophore (a united mass of sperm), which is transferred to the female following courtship behaviour, in which the male holds the ends of the female's first legs in his chelicerae. The spermatophore is deposited on the ground and picked up by the female using her genital area. In some genera, the male then uses his pedipalps to push the spermatophore into her body.

After a few months, the female will dig a large burrow and seal herself inside. Up to 40 eggs are extruded, within a membranous broodsac that preserves moisture and remains attached to the genital operculum and the fifth segment of the mother's ventral opisthosoma. The female refuses to eat and holds her opisthosoma in an upward arch so that the broodsac does not touch the ground for the next few months, as the eggs develop into postembryos. Appendages become visible.

The white young that hatch from the postembryos climb onto their mother's back and attach themselves there with special suckers. After the first moult, when they look like miniature adults but with bright red palps, they leave the burrow. The mother may live up to two more years. The young grow slowly, going through four moults in about four years before reaching adulthood. They live for up to another four years.

Distribution and habitat
Whip scorpions are found in tropical and subtropical areas, excluding Europe and Australia. Also, only a single species is known from Africa: Etienneus africanus, probably a Gondwana relict, endemic to Senegal, the Gambia and Guinea-Bissau. They usually dig burrows with their pedipalps, to which they transport their prey. They may also burrow under logs, rotting wood, rocks, and other natural debris. They prefer humid, dark places and avoid light. Mastigoproctus giganteus, the giant whip scorpion, is found in more arid areas, including Arizona and New Mexico.

Subtaxa

As of 2023, the World Uropygi Catalog accepted the following 16 extant genera, all placed in the family Thelyphonidae:

 Etienneus Heurtault, 1984
 Ginosigma Speijer, 1936
 Glyptogluteus Rowland, 1973
 Hypoctonus Thorell, 1888
 Labochirus Pocock, 1894
 Mastigoproctus Pocock, 1894
 Mayacentrum Viquez & Armas, 2006
 Mimoscorpius Pocock, 1894
 Ravilops Víquez & Armas, 2005
 Sheylayongium Teruel, 2018
 Thelyphonellus Pocock, 1894
 Thelyphonoides Krehenwinkel, Curio, Tacud & Haupt, 2009
 Thelyphonus Latreille, 1802
 Typopeltis Pocock, 1894
 Uroproctus Pocock, 1894
 Valeriophonus Viquez & Armas, 2005

In addition, seven extinct genera were accepted, two within the family Thelyphonidae:
 †Mesoproctus Dunlop, 1998
 †Mesothelyphonus Cai & Huang, 2017
and five unplaced as to family:
 †Burmathelyphonia Wunderlich, 2015
 †Geralinura Scudder, 1884
 †Parageralinura Tetlie & Dunlop, 2008
 †Proschizomus Dunlop & Horrocks, 1996
 †Prothelyphonus Frič, 1904

Notes

References

External links

 Video of vinegaroon mating behavior

 
Arachnid orders
Extant Pennsylvanian first appearances
Prehistoric arthropod orders
Carboniferous arachnids
Permian arachnids
Mesozoic arachnids
Cenozoic arachnids